Zurab Semyonovich Tsereteli (March 21, 1953 – 14 January 1992) was a Georgian professional footballer.

Club career
He made his professional debut in the Soviet Top League in 1973 for FC Dinamo Tbilisi. He played two games and scored one goal in the 1977–78 European Cup Winners' Cup semifinals for FC Dynamo Moscow.

Honours
 Soviet Top League bronze: 1976 (spring), 1976 (autumn).

References

1953 births
People from Imereti
1992 deaths
Association football forwards
Soviet footballers
FC Dinamo Tbilisi players
FC Dynamo Moscow players
Soviet Top League players
Pakhtakor Tashkent FK players